The Roger Williams Park Botanical Center is located in Roger Williams Park in Providence, Rhode Island. It opened in March 2007. It includes two connected greenhouses filled with plants, fountains, a fish pond and a small waterfall. It is the largest indoor garden open to the public in New England, encompassing approximately 12,000 square feet of indoor gardens.

The Botanical Center includes two greenhouses: The Conservatory and the Mediterranean Room. There are over 150 different species and cultivars of plants including 17 different types of palms. All the plants, with the exception of the large palm trees, were installed by park personnel. Many of the plants were saved from the old greenhouse displays and replanted, specifically most of the Cacti, Agave and Aloe.

See also
 List of botanical gardens and arboretums in Rhode Island

References

External links
Roger Williams Park Botanical Center
Greenhouse Setup Ideas & Layout

Buildings and structures in Providence, Rhode Island
Tourist attractions in Providence, Rhode Island
Greenhouses in the United States
Botanical gardens in Rhode Island
Agricultural buildings and structures in Rhode Island
2007 establishments in Rhode Island